N. V. R Educational Institution is a C.B.S.E affiliated English medium secondary school in Rayagada, Odisha, India. It was established in 2001.

References

High schools and secondary schools in Odisha
Education in Rayagada district
Educational institutions established in 2001
2001 establishments in Orissa